Succisa pratensis, also known as devil's-bit or devil's-bit scabious, is a flowering plant  in the honeysuckle family Caprifoliaceae.  It differs from other similar species in that it has four-lobed flowers, whereas small scabious and field scabious have five lobes and hence it has been placed in a separate genus in the same family.  It also grows on damper ground.

Name
Species of scabious were used to treat scabies, and other afflictions of the skin including sores caused by the bubonic plague.  The word scabies comes from the Latin word for "scratch" (scabere).  The short black root was in folk tales bitten off by the devil, angry at the plant's ability to cure these ailments, in anger against the Virgin Mary, or as part of some 'devilish plot'. The Latin specific epithet pratensis literally means "of the meadow".

Description
Succisa pratensis is a herbaceous perennial up to 1m tall, growing from a basal rosette of simple or distantly-toothed, lanceolate leaves. Its unlobed leaves distinguish it from Knautia arvensis (field scabious). The plant may be distinguished from Centaurea scabiosa (greater knapweed) by having its leaves in opposite pairs, not alternate as in knapweed.  The bluish to violet (occasionally pink) flowers are borne in tight compound flower heads or capitula. Individual flowers are tetramerous, with a four-lobed epicalyx and calyx and a four-lobed corolla. Male and female flowers are produced on different flower heads (gynodioecious), the female flower heads being smaller. The flowering period in the British Isles is from June until October.

Distribution
Succisa pratensis is common throughout most of the British Isles, western and central Europe, extending eastwards into central Asia. It is absent from eastern Asia. It has been introduced to eastern North America.

Ecology
It grows in wet or dry grassland and heath on acid or basic soils and is found in hedgerows, marshes, meadows and pastures.
The flowers are visited by various types of insects, but especially frequently by hoverflies of the genus Eristalis. It is a good source of nectar and is the larval food plant of the marsh fritillary,  the eggs of which are laid in groups on the underside of the plant, and the narrow-bordered bee hawk-moth (Hemaris tityus).  As both invertebrates are rare, their survival relies on careful management of sites containing these plant and butterfly species.

It is parasitized by the chytrid fungus Synchytrium succisae.

Management

This is to allow the devil's bit scabious food plant to grow.

This can be achieved through low intensity grazing (also known as extensive grazing) using cattle.  Sheep are not so good as they are more efficient at removing wild plants.

Gallery

References

External links

 The Plant Press Natural England Website

Articles containing video clips
pratensis